Warma may refer to:
 Aleksander Warma (1890-1970), Estonian statesman
 Warma, Iran, a village in Markazi Province, Iran
 Warma people, a people of Benin

See also
 Warmia